Sangil may be:

Sangil language
Sangil (Sangirese) people
Sangil Station, Korea